Maurice Labeyrie (3 October 1887 - 10 March 1969) was a French rugby union player who competed in the 1920 Summer Olympics. In 1920 he won the silver medal as member of the French team.

References

External links
profile

1887 births
1969 deaths
French rugby union players
Olympic rugby union players of France
Rugby union players at the 1920 Summer Olympics
Olympic silver medalists for France
Medalists at the 1920 Summer Olympics